Football Australia is the governing body of soccer, futsal, and beach soccer within Australia, headquartered in Sydney. Although the first governing body of the sport was founded in 1911, Football Australia in its current form was only established in 1961 as the Australian Soccer Federation. It was later reconstituted in 2003 as the Australian Soccer Association before adopting the name of Football Federation Australia in 2005. In contemporary identification, a corporate decision was undertaken to institute that name to deliver a "more united football" in a deliberation from the current CEO, James Johnson. The name was changed to Football Australia in December 2020.

Football Australia oversees the men's, women's, youth, Paralympic, beach and futsal national teams in Australia, the national coaching programs and the state governing bodies for the sport. It sanctions professional, semi-professional and amateur soccer in Australia. Football Australia made the decision to leave the Oceania Football Confederation (OFC), for which it was a founding member, and become a member of the Asian Football Confederation (AFC) on 1 January 2006 and ASEAN Football Federation (AFF) on 27 August 2013.

History
Football Australia's origins lie as far back as 1911, with the formation of the "Commonwealth Football Association". This body was then superseded by the Australian Soccer Football Association, which was formed in 1921, with its headquarters in Sydney. The Australian Soccer Football Association operated for forty years, was given FIFA provisional membership in November 1954 and this was confirmed in June 1956, however in 1960, the association disbanded after being suspended from FIFA for the poaching of players from overseas. In 1961 the Australian Soccer Federation was formed as a potential successor to the former governing body for the sport. However, this association was refused re-admittance to FIFA until outstanding fines had been paid, which was later done in 1963, seeing the new national body admitted to FIFA.

Isolated from international football, Australia repeatedly applied to join the Asian Football Confederation in 1960, and in 1974 but were denied in all requests. Australia with New Zealand eventually formed the Oceania Football Federation (now Oceania Football Confederation) in 1966. Australia resigned as an OFC member in 1972 to pursue membership with the AFC, but they rejoined in 1978.

In 1995, the Australian Soccer Federation formally changed its name to Soccer Australia.

In 2003, following Australia's failure to qualify for the 2002 FIFA World Cup, allegations of fraud and mismanagement were levelled at Soccer Australia by elements within the Australian Press including the ABC. Soccer Australia commissioned an independent inquiry known as the Crawford Report as a result of the Australian Government's threat to withdraw funding to the sport. The Australian Government could not interfere as any political interference would have constituted a breach of FIFA Statutes. The findings of the report were critically analysed by the board of Soccer Australia who believed that the recommendations contained therein were not capable of being implemented. The report recommended, among other things, the reconstitution of the governing body with an interim board headed by prominent businessman Frank Lowy. Some three months after Lowy's appointment Soccer Australia was placed into liquidation and Australia Soccer Association (ASA) was created without encompassing the Crawford Report recommendations and effectively disenfranchising all parties who had an interest in Soccer Australia. The Australian Government provided approximately $15 million to the ASA.

On 1 January 2005, ASA renamed itself to Football Federation Australia (FFA), aligning with the general international usage of the word "football", in preference to "soccer", and to also distance itself from the failings of the old Soccer Australia. It coined the phrase "old soccer, new football" to emphasise this.

On 1 January 2006, Football Federation Australia moved from the OFC to the AFC. The move was unanimously endorsed by the AFC Executive Committee on 23 March 2005, and assented by the OFC on 17 April. The FIFA Executive Committee approved the move on 29 June, noting that "as all of the parties involved ... had agreed to the move, the case did not need to be discussed by the FIFA Congress", and was unanimously ratified by the AFC on 10 September. Football Australia hoped that the move would give Australia a fairer chance of qualifying for the FIFA World Cup and allow A-League clubs to compete in the AFC Champions League, thereby improving the standard of Australian football at both international and club levels with improved competition in the region.

In February 2008, the Football Federation Australia formally announced their intention to bid for the 2018 FIFA World Cup, 2022 FIFA World Cup and the 2015 AFC Asian Cup. In 2010, the decision was made by Football Australia to withdraw its World Cup bid for 2018, instead focusing on a bid for the 2022 tournament. FFA failed in its $45.6 million bid for the 2022 World Cup having received only one vote from the FIFA Executive.

In 2013, Australia was admitted as a full member to the ASEAN Football Federation (AFF), after they formally joined as an invite affiliation to the regional body in 2006.

On 29 January 2015, after the defeat of Iraq and the United Arab Emirates during the 2015 AFC Asian Cup, West Asian Football Federation members reportedly sought to remove Australia from the AFC primarily due to "Australia benefiting hugely from Asian involvement without giving much in return".

In November 2018 with numerous board positions coming to the end of their 3-year term, the bulk of the board of directors were replaced at an annual general meeting, as well as the departure of Steven Lowy as chair of the board, which he did in protest at major changes to the governance and voting structure in the overarching Football Australia Congress that elects the Board. His position was filled by Chris Nikou. Other board members to be elected were Heather Reid, Joseph Carrozzi and Remo Nogarotto.

On 25 June 2020, Australia won the rights to co-host the 2023 FIFA Women's World Cup alongside New Zealand.

On 25 November 2020, the FFA Annual General Meeting (AGM) was held. The FFA voted to rename itself to Football Australia. Football Australia Chief Executive, James Johnson, told the media the rebranding would not cost the organisation any money as they already owned the domain and company names. The name change was seen as a way to unify the branding with the state member federations.

On 31 December 2020, it was announced that the A-League, W-League and Y-League would no longer be under the jurisdiction of Football Australia in an 'unbundling' process. The newly formed Australian Professional Leagues would take over the running of top-level football. As part of the unbundling, the Australian Professional Leagues would also obtain the exclusive right to use the intellectual property rights associated with the A-League brand.

Administration

Soccer in Australia has used a federated model of national, states and territories governing bodies since the first state body was established in New South Wales in 1882. Local associations and regional zones were set up within the states and territories as soccer expanded and from time to time informal groups of clubs have augmented the formal structures. Today, there is one national governing body, nine state and territory member federations and over 100 district, regional and local zones and associations.

 Capital Football
 Northern NSW Football
 Football NSW
 Football Northern Territory
 Football Queensland
 Football South Australia
 Football Tasmania
 Football Victoria
 Football West

Corporate structure

Board of directors

Senior management team

Team staff

National Indigenous Advisory Group

In November 2021, Football Australia created the inaugural National Indigenous Advisory Group (NIAG), an advisory body aimed at helping to foster engagement with Aboriginal and Torres Strait Islander people and increase their participation in the game. NIAG is an advisory body for Football Australia, comprising 9 members of First Nations communities.

The inaugural members of the group are drawn from all levels of football as well as media, academia, and government: Frank Farina OAM, Karen Menzies (the first Indigenous Matilda), Tanya Oxtoby, Kyah Simon, Jade North (former Socceroos defender), Courtney Hagan, Kenny Bedford, Selina Holtze, Professor John Maynard, Narelda Jacobs, and Football Australia's Head of Women's Football, Sarah Walsh. North and Walsh are co-chairs of the group.

The initial focus of NIAG is on supporting and retaining First Nations players and other staff involved in the game, reviewing pathways and programs to football that impact social outcomes, fostering strategic partnerships, as well as developing employment strategies and the organisation's reconciliation action plan (RAP).

Competitions

Football Australia organises several national competitions, with state-based competitions organised by the respective state governing football bodies.

 A-League Men (ceased ownership of the competition in July 2019)
 Australia Cup
 National Premier Leagues
 A-League Women, formerly W-League (ceased ownership of the competition in July 2019)
 A-League Youth, formerly Y-League (ceased ownership of the competition in July 2019)
 FFA State Institute Challenge
 F-League

See also

 Soccer in Australia
 Futsal in Australia

References

External links 
 
 Australia at FIFA.com
 Australia at The-AFC.com

 
Soccer governing bodies in Australia
Australia
1961 establishments in Australia
Sports organizations established in 1961
Organisations based in Sydney